Batboldyn Tögsbileg is a Mongolian footballer who plays as a forward for Mongolian Premier League club Erchim and the Mongolian national team. He made his first appearance for the Mongolia national football team in 2013.

References

Mongolian footballers
Living people
Association football forwards
Year of birth missing (living people)
Mongolia international footballers
Mongolian National Premier League players